Dennis "Tom" Linco Hernandez is a Filipino politician who last served as mayor of Rodriguez (Montalban), Rizal from 2019 to 2022. He previously served as vice mayor of the town from 2016 to 2019.

In the May 13, 2019 election, he ran under the banner of the Nationalist People's Coalition and defeated independent candidates Romeo Grecia, Felicisimo Salvador, and Herminio Balinas.

References

Mayors of places in Rizal
People from Rodriguez, Rizal
1984 births
Living people